Don Ramesh George Subasinghe (born 9 October 1983) is a former Sri Lankan first-class cricketer, who played for Nondescripts Cricket Club, Colombo, as an opening bowler and a left-handed batsman.
 
Subasinghe was born in Colombo, Sri Lanka, and was educated at St Peter's College, Colombo. His best first-class bowling figures were 6 for 48. Subasinghe gave up on his first class cricket career after series of injuries and now works as a full-time cricket coach. He was the head coach for Hawke Cup District, Horowhenua-Kapiti Cricket Association; he played and coached the multiple trophy winning Paraparaumu Cricket Club in 2016–18. He has also worked at Northern Districts Cricket Association as a development officer and a performance coach.

Subasinghe appeared in Strongbow's 'earn it' campaign in 2013 for a club cricketer to face an over from James Anderson where he bowled and was a selector. Subasinghe was awarded Cricket Development Officer of the year award at New Zealand Cricket annual cricket awards in 2021. In June 2021 he was appointed to Performance coaching staff at Otago Cricket Association.

References

Sri Lankan cricketers
Nondescripts Cricket Club cricketers
1983 births
Alumni of St. Peter's College, Colombo
Living people